

 (23 Februari 1899 – 28 March 1997), real name Kambara Yasushi, artist name Tai, was a Japanese poet, painter, writer, art critic and Japanese futurism pioneer.

Life
Kambara was born in Sendai, Osaka, but his family soon moved to Tokyo. Kambara Tai started out as a poet, but then temporarily turned to painting. In 1917 he submitted his paintings for the exhibition of the artists' association Nika-kai (二 科 会). In 1920 Kambara founded the avant-garde art group "Action" (アクション, Akushon) together with Harue Koga, Kigen Nakagawa (中 川 紀元; 1892–1972), Junnosuke Yokoyama (横山 潤 之 助; 1903–1971) and others. It was part of the group "Future Wings of Art" (未来 派 美術 協会, Mirai-ha bijutsu kyōkai), abbreviated to "MAVO" (マヴォ). He then founded the art group "Sanka" (三 科) in 1925 followed by "Layout" (造形, "Zōkei"), from which he withdrew in 1927. That was also the time when he seized his painting activities.
Kambara exchanged letters with futurist Filippo Tommaso Marinetti and wrote numerous publications about futurism. In 1990 he donated his material on Picasso and the avant-garde movement as the "Kambara Tai Library" to the Ohara Museum of Art in Kurashiki.
He died as a result of heart failure on March 28, 1997 in Minami-ku, Yokohama at the age of 98.

Literature
 Japanese Modern Art: Painting from 1910 to 1970, Edition Stemmle, Zürich – New York, 1999,

Expositions
 1917 – 4e Nika-ten, Tokyo
 1923 – Action, Tokyo, Mitsukoshi
 1925 – Sanka Society, Tokyo, Matsuzakaya
 1936 – Kayu (Friends of Painting), Tokyo, Itoya
 1986 – Japanese Avant-garde 1910–1970, Paris, Centre Georges Pompidou
 1988 – 1920s in Japan, National Museum of Modern Art, Tokyo
 1992 – Abstract art in Japan 1910–1945, Tokyo, Itabashi Museum of Art
 1993 – Japan and Europa 1543–1929, Berlin, Martin-Gropius-Bau.

References

External links
Ohara Museum of Art

1899 births
1997 deaths
People from Tokyo
Japanese male poets
20th-century Japanese poets
20th-century Japanese male writers